Victor-Armand Poirson (May 19, 1858 – February 13, 1893) was a French illustrator and cartoonist.

Biography
He illustrated Salammbô by Gustave Flaubert in 1887, L'Âne de Lucius (translation by Paul-Louis Courier) in 1887, The War of Carlo du Monge in 1886, The Tale of the Archer by Armand Silvestre in 1883 (engraved watercolors by Gillot). He also worked for the illustrated newspapers La Vie moderne, Le Chat noir, and Le Journal de la jeunesse.

He died on February 13, 1893, at his home in the 6th arrondissement, in Paris.

Works

Illustrated books
Armand Silvestre, Le Conte de l'Archer, Paris, Lahure, 1883
Jonathan Swift, Gulliver's Travels, Quantin, 1884
Oliver Goldsmith, The Vicar of Wakefield, 1885
Gustave Flaubert, Salammbô, Paris, Quantin, 1887
Catullus, Thetis and Peleus, Paris, Quantin, 1889

References

External links

French cartoonists